Tetragonoderus kuntzeni is a species of beetle in the family Carabidae. It was described by Burgeon in 1936.

References

kuntzeni
Beetles described in 1936